Hardcase and Fist is a 1989  American action film written and directed  by Tony Zarindast and starring  Ted Prior.

Plot

Cast 
 
 Ted Prior as  Bud McCall 
  Carter Wong as Eddy Lee 
  Tony Zarindast as Tony Marino 
 Christina Lunde as Sharon
 Vincent Barbi as Vincent  
 Maureen LaVette as Nora
 Debra Lamb  as Chieko
  Angelyne as Sly Fox Dancer
 Tony Margulies as Cowboy

References

External links 

1989 action films
1989 films
American action films
1980s English-language films
1980s American films